46th National Board of Review Awards
December 25, 1974
The 46th National Board of Review Awards were announced on December 25, 1974.

Top Ten Films 
The Conversation
Murder on the Orient Express
Chinatown
The Last Detail
Harry and Tonto
A Woman Under the Influence
Thieves Like Us
Lenny
Daisy Miller
The Three Musketeers

Top Foreign Films 
Amarcord
Lacombe Lucien
Scenes from a Marriage
The Phantom of Liberty
The Pedestrian

Winners 
Best Film:
The Conversation
Best Foreign Film:
Amarcord
Best Actor:
Gene Hackman - The Conversation
Best Actress:
Gena Rowlands - A Woman Under the Influence
Best Supporting Actor:
Holger Löwenadler - Lacombe Lucien
Best Supporting Actress:
Valerie Perrine - Lenny
Best Director:
Francis Ford Coppola - The Conversation
Special Citation: 
The Golden Voyage of Sinbad, Earthquake and The Towering Inferno, for outstanding special effects
Robert Youngson, for his 25-year work with tasteful and intelligent compilation of films
The Film Industry, for increasing care in subsidiary casting in many films

External links 
 National Board of Review of Motion Pictures :: Awards for 1974

1974
1974 film awards
1974 in American cinema